Babcock is an census-designated place located in Wood County, Wisconsin, United States. Babcock is southwest of Wisconsin Rapids, in the town of Remington. Babcock has a post office with ZIP code 54413. As of the 2010 census, its population is 126. Its motto is "Birds, Bogs, and Bucks." The community was named for Joseph W. Babcock, a sawmill operator who purchased the site and built a hotel and a depot.

Babcock was once an important junction on the Milwaukee Road, with lines running north, east, south, and southwest.  Today, however, only a single track of the Canadian National runs south to Necedah and east to Port Edwards and Wisconsin Rapids.

Images

See also
 List of census-designated places in Wisconsin

References

External links

 1909 plat map of Babcock
 1928 plat map

Census-designated places in Wood County, Wisconsin
Census-designated places in Wisconsin